St. Michael's College National School (SMC; ; known as St. Michael's College) is a national school in Batticaloa, Sri Lanka. It was founded in 1873 as a private school and nationalized in mid-70s. The school's founder and architect was French Jesuit missionary, Ferdinand Bonnel.

History 
French Jesuit missionaries founded the school in 1873. Later, it was taken over by American Jesuits. In 1960, most of the private schools in Ceylon were taken over by the government but SMC chose to remain private. Jesuits had to pay the wages of teachers and had to manage other expenses. Therefore, in the mid 70s, they decided to hand over the school to the government. The school buildings were the finest building in the city.

Sports 
The St. Michael's College is famous for basketball and has won several all island basketball championships. Their victories made the school popular and were dubbed as The Invincibles. Jesuit missionaries introduced basketball to Batticaloa, and installed the first basketball court within the school premises. There were several Jesuit priests who played basketball and were good at it. Fr. Hamilton, Fr. Ralph Riemen, Fr. Eugene John Hebert, and Fr. Harold J. Weber were among the best contributors.

See also 
 List of the oldest schools in Sri Lanka
 List of schools in Eastern Province, Sri Lanka

References 

 
1873 establishments in Ceylon
Educational institutions established in 1873
National schools in Sri Lanka
Schools in Batticaloa